Follansbee is a surname. Notable people with the surname include:

Clyde Follansbee (1902–1948), American politician
Edward Follansbee Noyes (1832–1890), American politician
Elizabeth Follansbee (1839–1917), American physician and professor